Monnina fosbergii is a species of plant in the family Polygalaceae. It is endemic to Ecuador.

References

fosbergii
Endemic flora of Ecuador
Critically endangered plants
Taxonomy articles created by Polbot
Taxobox binomials not recognized by IUCN